The Roma Education Fund (REF) is a non-governmental organization established within the framework of the Decade of Roma Inclusion by Open Society Foundations (formerly Open Society Institute) and the World Bank in 2005. The organization's goal is to reduce the educational achievement gap between Roma and non-Roma in Europe through the provision of scholarships to Roma students, supporting the development of quality education, and supporting the removal of segregation of Roma students.

History 
In July 2003, a conference "Roma in an Expanding Europe: Challenges for the Future", co-financed by the Open Society Institute, was held in Budapest. The conference resolved to establish the Decade of Roma Inclusion and the Roma Education Fund.

The network of Roma Education Fund consists of six entities (REF Entities), i.e. five which have been established as legally separate foundations beside the parent organization in Switzerland (established in 2005). REF Entities operate in Hungary (2006), Romania (2009), Slovakia (2014), North Macedonia and Serbia (2019). The REF Entities cooperate based on the Cooperation Agreement to achieve their shared primary objective to close the gap in educational outcomes between Roma and non-Roma. Each REF Entity has a separate board with independent members for their decisions, who are also attending meetings of REF Switzerland Governing Board.

Strategic Objectives 
REF program objectives are aligned and contribute directly to Sustainable Development Goals 4 as defined by the UN: Ensure inclusive and equitable quality education and promote lifelong learning opportunities for all.

REF has developed programs along three strategic approaches that contribute to the overall goal:
 At the individual level, supporting individual beneficiaries, Roma Education Fund promotes access to education to achieve good learning outcomes and successful transitions into the labor market.
 At the system level, REF works with and sensitizes education systems, advocating for the needs and interests of Roma and promoting changes to ensure access for all to inclusive, good quality education.
 At the organizational level, to develop REF into a specialized organization, for mobilizing the human potential of Roma and their contribution to teaching, including developing innovative methodologies.

Programs

Grants 

The Roma Education Fund provides grants for governmental and non-governmental organizations in the Decade of Roma Inclusion countries to support the implementation of local projects in the field of Roma education at all education levels:
 Expanding access to preschool education
 Ensuring full Roma participation in primary education
 Expanding access to secondary education
 Expanding access to higher Education
 Assuring desegregation and integration of Roma in education
New efforts are being developed to improve employability and skills through job training programs for young adults and REF alumni from secondary and tertiary education.

Research 

REF’s research activities have impacts beyond the individual beneficiaries to reach the society, institutional, and systemic levels, leading to long-term improvement in education for Roma individuals and communities.
REF research strives for the following objectives:
 Create knowledge and expertise in inclusive education
 Influence public and expert opinion on inclusive education
 Establish a leading role in shaping educational systems
 Build the evidence needed for policy change through external research and community engagement

Scholarships 

The Roma Education Fund Scholarship Program provides financial and academic support to Roma students in 16 countries (Albania, Bosnia and Herzegovina, Bulgaria, Croatia, Czechia, Hungary, Kosovo, Moldova, Montenegro, North Macedonia, Romania, Russia, Serbia, Slovakia, Turkey and Ukraine). In addition to providing financial aid, the scholarship program incorporates mentoring and tutoring for students to support their education.  REF offers four academic merit-based scholarships: Roma Memorial University Scholarship Program (RMUSP), Roma International Scholar Program (RISP), Law and Humanities Program (LHP), and Roma Health Scholarship Program (RHSP). These scholarship schemes support Romani students pursuing Bachelor, Master, and Doctorate degree programs.

Advocacy and policy development 

REF advocacy stresses a competence and ability-based approach where the main emphasis is placed on the social, economic, and political capital of Roma citizens and communities. To do so, REF follows four pathways in order to advocate among a broad coalition of stakeholders:
 Networking, coalition building, gaining political support
 Educational policy shaping
 Creating educational platforms for communities
 Increasing the employability of Roma Education Fund’s target groups

European Court of Human Rights cases 

The Roma Education Fund has played a role in a number of cases pertaining to education in the European Court of Human Rights. In 2007, research and observations by the Roma Education Fund were cited in the decision of the landmark case of D.H. and Others v. the Czech Republic concerning the discrimination of Romani children in the Czech educational system.  REF noted the high incidence of placing children into special schools in the Czech Republic compared with other Central and Eastern European countries, the lack of a national definition of "disability" in countries within the region, and the negative effects of special schools on educational achievement.

References

External links 
 
 Roma Education Fund Romania website
 Decade of Roma Inclusion
 Annual Report
 REF at a glance

Romani advocacy
Romani culture